Kojetín is a town in Přerov District in the Olomouc Region of the Czech Republic. It has about 5,800 inhabitants.

Administrative parts
Villages of Kovalovice and Popůvky are administrative parts of Kojetín.

Geography

It lies mostly in the Upper Morava Valley, the southern part of the municipal territory is located in the Litenčice Hills. The town is located on the right bank of the Morava River, the Haná River flows south of the town.

Kojetín lies in the ethnographic region of Haná.

History
According to legends, origins of Kojetín can be traced to the times of Samo's Empire. The town is said to receive its name after Samo's legendary son Kojata, who founded a settlement named Kojata, later Kojetín. In fact, it was probably not founded until the 12th or 13th century. The first written mention of Kojetín is from 1233.

Until the Hussite Wars, Kojetín was owned by the Diocese of Prague. After the wars, it was acquired by Jiří of Sternberg. Until the 18th century, it was gradually owned by several aristocratic families. The town achieved the most significant development during the reign of the Pernštejn family. In 1720 it returned to the property of the Diocese of Prague.

Demographics

Sights

The most important monument and the landmark of the town is the Church of the Assumption of the Virgin Mary. This Baroque church from the end of the 17th century was built on a Gothic ground plan.

The former synagogue in Kojetín is one of the oldest synagogues in Moravia. The building currently serves as a prayer house for the Czechoslovak Hussite Church. There is also a Jewish cemetery, first documented after 1550.

Notable people
Jan Tomáš Kuzník (1716–1786), composer and poet; died here
Beda Dudík (1815–1890), historian
David Kaufmann (1852–1899), Jewish scholar
Eduard Hedvicek (1878–1947), Austrian historic personality
Libor Žůrek (born 1979), footballer

References

External links

Jews of Kojetín

Populated places in Přerov District
Cities and towns in the Czech Republic